Lupin the Third Part II, also known as Shin Lupin III or simply as Lupin III for the American market, is a Japanese anime series based on the manga by Monkey Punch and is produced by Tokyo Movie Shinsha. The first season, which contains 26 episodes, aired between October 3, 1977 and April 3, 1978 on NTV. The opening theme is Theme from Lupin III '77 by Yuji Ohno, while the ending theme is the instrumental version of Love Theme, also by Yuji Ohno. In the United States, twenty-six episodes of English adaptation of the series aired on Adult Swim starting on January 14, 2003 at midnight ET with the exception of episode 3, which was skipped due to its Nazi themes. In Canada, the entire first season of the series aired on G4techTV's Anime Current from May 7 to June 11, 2007.


Episode list

Notes

References
Specific
 Original Japanese titles were obtained from:  (Official Japanese website with episode listings)
 Original airdates were obtained from:  (Unofficial English website with episode listings translated into English)
 English translations and information about episodes broadcast in stereo and produced by Studio Telecom were obtained from: 
 American DVD release titles were obtained from the Region 1 DVDs released by Geneon

General

1977 Japanese television seasons
1978 Japanese television seasons
Lupin the Third Part II Season 1